Dhansagor Union is an Union parishad of Sarankhola Upazila, Bagerhat District in Khulna Division of Bangladesh. It has an area of 89.15 km2 (34.42 sq mi) and a population of 19,417.

References

Unions of Sarankhola Upazila
Unions of Bagerhat District
Unions of Khulna Division